Heliria is a genus of treehoppers in the family Membracidae.

Species
These 13 species belang tae the genus Heliria:
 Heliria clitella
 Heliria cornutula
 Heliria cristata
 Heliria fitchi
 Heliria gemma
 Heliria gibberata
 Heliria mexicana
 Heliria molaris
 Heliria praealta
 Heliria scalaris
 Heliria sinuata
 Heliria strombergi
 Heliria turritella

References

Smiliinae
Auchenorrhyncha genera